Inner Sister Island, part of the Sister Islands Conservation Area, is a granite and dolerite island, with an area of , located in Bass Strait, Tasmania, Australia.

Location and features
The Inner Sister Island is located north of Flinders Island in the Furneaux Group.  The island is grazed by sheep and annual muttonbirding takes place.

Seabirds and waders recorded as breeding on the island include little penguin, short-tailed shearwater, silver gull, Pacific gull, pied oystercatcher and sooty oystercatcher.  Resident reptiles are the three-lined skink, White's skink, white-lipped snake and tiger snake.  Apart from the sheep, mammals present on the island include the eastern barred bandicoot, Tasmanian pademelon and the introduced European hare.

See also

 List of islands of Tasmania
 Outer Sister Island
 Shag Reef

References

External links
 

Furneaux Group